Egg bread may refer to: 

 French toast
 Egg in the basket
 Gyeran-ppang
Eggy Bread
 egg-based bread
 Challah
 Brioche

See also
 Egg sandwich